Adolf Stocker (born 26 February 1894, date of death unknown) was a Swiss fencer. He competed in the individual and team sabre events at the 1936 Summer Olympics.

References

1894 births
Year of death missing
Swiss male fencers
Olympic fencers of Switzerland
Fencers at the 1936 Summer Olympics